Hirabayashi Station is the name of multiple train stations in Japan.

 Hirabayashi Station (Niigata) in Niigata Prefecture
 Hirabayashi Station (Osaka) in Osaka Prefecture